Gudermes (Gümse or , Guthermajas) is a town in the Chechen Republic, Russia, located on the Sunzha River  east of Grozny, the republic's capital. Population:     32,000 (1970).

History
Gudermes had rural locality status until 1941. Later, it became a railroad junction between Rostov-on-Don, Baku, Astrakhan, and Mozdok.

Climate
Gudermes has a humid continental climate (Köppen: Dfa) closely bordering a humid subtropical climate (Köppen: Cfa) .

Administrative and municipal status
Within the framework of administrative divisions, Gudermes serves as the administrative center of Gudermessky District, even though it is not a part of it. As an administrative division, it is incorporated separately as the town of republic significance of Gudermes—an administrative unit with the status equal to that of the districts. As a municipal division, the town of republic significance of Gudermes is incorporated within Gudermessky Municipal District as Gudermesskoye Urban Settlement.

Economy
Gudermes is home to petroleum extraction industries.

References

Notes

Sources

Cities and towns in Chechnya